Tobacco was long used in the early Americas. The arrival of Spain introduced tobacco to the Europeans, and it became a lucrative, heavily traded commodity to support the popular habit of smoking. Following the industrial revolution, cigarettes became hugely popular worldwide. In the mid-20th century, medical research demonstrated severe negative health effects of tobacco smoking including lung and throat cancer, which led to a sharp decline in tobacco use.

Early history

Pre-Columbian America
Tobacco was first discovered by the native people of Mesoamerica and South America and later introduced to Europe and the rest of the world.

Archeological finds indicate that humans in the Americas began using tobacco as far back as 12,300 years ago, thousands of years earlier than previously documented.

Tobacco had already long been used in the Americas by the time European settlers arrived and took the practice to Europe, where it became popular. Eastern North American tribes have historically carried tobacco in pouches as a readily accepted trade item, as well as smoking it in pipe ceremonies, whether for sacred ceremonies or those to seal a treaty or agreement.

In addition to its use in spiritual and religious ceremonies, tobacco is also used for medical treatment of physical conditions. As a pain killer it has been used for earache and toothache and occasionally as a poultice. Some indigenous peoples in California have used tobacco as one ingredient in smoking mixtures for treating colds; usually it is mixed with the leaves of the small desert sage, Salvia dorrii, or the root of Indian balsam or cough root, Leptotaenia multifida (the addition of which was thought to be particularly good for asthma and tuberculosis). In addition to its traditional medicinal uses, tobacco was also used as a form of currency between Native Americans and Colonists from the 1620s on.

Ceremonial use 
Religious use of tobacco is still common among many indigenous peoples, particularly in the Americas. Among the Cree and Ojibwe of Canada and the north-central United States, it is offered to the Creator, with prayers, and is used in sweat lodges, pipe ceremonies, and is presented as a gift. A gift of tobacco is traditional when asking an Ojibwe elder a question of a spiritual nature.

European usage

Greek and Roman accounts exist of smoking hemp seeds, and a Spanish poem  mentions the energetic effects of lavender smoke, but tobacco was completely unfamiliar to Europeans before the discovery of the New World. Bartolomé de las Casas described how the first scouts sent by Christopher Columbus into the interior of Cuba found:

Following the arrival of Europeans, tobacco became one of the primary products fueling colonization, and also became a driving factor in the introduction of African slave labour. The Spanish introduced tobacco to Europeans in about 1528, and by 1533, Diego Columbus mentioned a tobacco merchant of Lisbon in his will, showing how quickly the traffic had sprung up. The French, Spanish, and Portuguese initially referred to the plant as the "sacred herb" because of its valuable medicinal properties.

Jean Nicot, French ambassador in Lisbon, sent samples to Paris in 1559. Nicot sent leaves and seeds to Francis II and the King's mother, Catherine of Medici, with instructions to use tobacco as snuff. The king's recurring headaches (perhaps sinus trouble) were reportedly "marvellously cured" by snuff. (Francis II nevertheless died at seventeen years of age on 5 December 1560, after a reign of less than two years). French cultivation of herbe de la Reine (the queen's herb) began in 1560. By 1570 botanists referred to tobacco as Nicotiana, although André Thevet claimed that he, not Nicot, had introduced tobacco to France; historians believe this unlikely, but Thevet was the first Frenchman to write about it.

Swiss doctor Conrad Gesner in 1563 reported that chewing or smoking a tobacco leaf "has a wonderful power of producing a kind of peaceful drunkenness". In 1571, Spanish doctor Nicolas Monardes wrote a book about the history of medicinal plants of the new world. In this he claimed that tobacco could cure 36 health problems, and reported that the plant was first brought to Spain for its flowers, but "Now we use it to a greater extent for the sake of its virtues than for its beauty".

John Hawkins was the first to bring tobacco seeds to England. William Harrison's English Chronology mentions tobacco smoking in the country as of 1573, before Sir Walter Raleigh brought the first "Virginia" tobacco to Europe from the Roanoke Colony, referring to it as tobah as early as 1578. In 1595 Anthony Chute published Tabaco, which repeated earlier arguments about the benefits of the plant and emphasised the health-giving properties of pipe-smoking. A popular song of the early 1600s by Tobias Hume proclaimed that "Tobacco is Like Love".

The importation of tobacco into England was not without resistance and controversy. Stuart King James I wrote a famous polemic titled A Counterblaste to Tobacco in 1604, in which the king denounced tobacco use as "[a] custome lothsome to the eye, hatefull to the Nose, harmefull to the braine, dangerous to the Lungs, and in the blacke stinking fume thereof, neerest resembling the horrible Stigian smoke of the pit that is bottomelesse." That year, an English statute was enacted that placed a heavy protective tariff on tobacco imports. The duty rose from 2p per pound to 6s 10p, a 40-fold increase, but English demand remained strong despite the high price; Barnabee Rych reported that 7,000 stores in London sold tobacco and calculated that at least 319,375 pounds sterling were spent on tobacco annually. Because the Virginia and Bermuda colonies' economies were affected by the high duty, James in 1624 instead created a royal monopoly. No tobacco could be imported except from Virginia, and a royal license that cost 15 pounds per year was required to sell it. To help the colonies, Charles II banned tobacco cultivation in England, but allowed herb gardens for medicinal purposes.

Tobacco was introduced elsewhere in continental Europe more easily. Iberia exported "ropes" of dry leaves in baskets to the Netherlands and southern Germany; for a while tobacco was in Spanish called canaster after the word for basket (canastro), and influenced the German Knaster. In Italy, Prospero Santacroce in 1561 and Nicolo Torbabuoni in 1570 introduced it to gardens after seeing the plant on diplomatic missions. Cardinal Crescenzio introduced smoking to the country in about 1610 after learning about it in England. The Roman Catholic Church did not condemn tobacco as James I did, but Pope Urban VIII threatened excommunication for smoking in a church.

In Russia, tobacco use was banned in 1634 except for foreigners in Moscow. Peter the Great—who in England had learned of smoking and the royal monopoly—became the monarch in 1689, however. Revoking all bans, he licensed the Muscovy Company to import 1.5 million pounds of tobacco per year, with the Russian Crown receiving 28,000 pounds sterling annually.

Asia
The Japanese were introduced to tobacco by Portuguese sailors from 1542.

Tobacco first arrived in the Ottoman Empire in the late 16th century, where it attracted the attention of doctors and became a commonly prescribed medicine for many ailments. Although tobacco was initially prescribed as medicine, further study led to claims that smoking caused dizziness, fatigue, dulling of the senses, and a foul taste/odour in the mouth.

Sultan Murad IV banned smoking in the Ottoman Empire in 1633. When the ban was lifted by his successor, Ibrahim the Mad, it was instead taxed. In 1682, Damascene jurist Abd al-Ghani al-Nabulsi declared: "Tobacco has now become extremely famous in all the countries of Islam ... People of all kinds have used it and devoted themselves to it ... I have even seen young children of about five years applying themselves to it." In 1750, a Damascene townsmen observed "a number of women greater than the men, sitting along the bank of the Barada River. They were eating and drinking, and drinking coffee and smoking tobacco just as the men were doing."

Australia
Although Nicotiana suaveolens is native to Australia, tobacco smoking first reached that continent shores when it was introduced to northern-dwelling Indigenous communities by visiting Indonesian fishermen in the early 18th century. British patterns of tobacco use were transported to Australia along with the new settlers in 1788; and in the years following colonisation, British smoking behaviour was rapidly adopted by Indigenous people as well. By the early 19th century tobacco was an essential commodity routinely issued to servants, prisoners and ticket-of-leave men (conditionally released convicts) as an inducement to work, or conversely, withheld as a means of punishment.

United States

Economic history in the American colonies
In Thirteen Colonies, where gold and silver were scarce, tobacco was used as a currency to trade with Native Americans, and sometimes for official purposes such as paying fines, taxes, and even marriage license fees.

The demand and profitability of tobacco led to the shift in the colonies to a slave-based labor force, fueling the slave trade. Tobacco is a labor-intensive crop, requiring much work for its cultivation, harvest, and curing. With the profitability of the land rapidly increasing, it was no longer economically viable to bring in indentured servants with the promise of land benefits at the end of their tenure. By bringing African slaves instead, plantation owners acquired workers for long hours in the hot sun without paying them, providing only a bare subsistence to workers who could not leave or appeal to laws.

The uncultivated Virginia soil was reportedly too rich for traditional European crops, especially cereals like barley. Tobacco "broke down the fields and made food crops more productive" by depleting the soil of nutrients.

Tobacco's impact on early American history
The cultivation of tobacco in America led to many changes. During the 1700s tobacco was a very lucrative crop due to its high demand in Europe. The climate of the Chesapeake area in America lent itself very nicely to the cultivation of tobacco. The high European demand for tobacco led to a rise in the value of tobacco. The rise of value of tobacco accelerated the economic growth in America. The cultivation of tobacco as a cash crop in America marks the shift from a subsistence economy to an agrarian economy. Tobacco's desirability and value led to it being used as a currency in colonies. Tobacco was also backed by the gold standard, with an established conversion rate from tobacco to gold.

The increasing role of tobacco as a cash crop led to a shift in the labor force that would shape American life and politics up through the Civil war. In order to keep up with demand tobacco plantation owners had to abandon the traditional practice of indentured servitude in the Americas. In order to pursue maximum profits, the plantation owners turned to slavery to supply them with the cheap, fungible labor that they needed to keep up with increasing production.

Early cultivation of tobacco
In the first few years of tobacco cultivation in the colonies, the plants were simply covered with hay and left in the field to cure or "sweat." This method was abandoned after 1618, when regulations prohibited the use of valuable potential animal food for such purposes. It was also abandoned because a better method of curing tobacco had been developed. In this new method the wilted leaves were hung on lines or sticks, at first outside on fence rails. Tobacco barns for housing the crop were in use by the 1620s.

During the curing period, which lasted about four to six weeks, the color of the tobacco changed from a greenish yellow to a light tan. Mold was an immense danger during this time. Once again, a planter relied on his experience to know when the tobacco was ready to be removed from the sticks on which it hung, a process known as "striking."

At last, when the tobacco was ready, and preferably during a period of damp weather, workers struck the tobacco and laid the leaves on the floor of the tobacco barn to sweat for somewhere between a week or two. Logs could be used to press the tobacco and increase its temperature, but with that there came a danger. The heat might become too intense and mold spoil the crop.

After sweating, the next step was sorting. Ideally, all the tobacco should be in a condition described by cropmasters as "in case". This meant that the tobacco had absorbed just the right amount of moisture; it could be stretched like leather, and was glossy and moist. If tobacco were too damp, it would rot in transit; if too dry, it would crumble and be unsalable.

In the early years at Jamestown the settlers paid little heed to quality control, this attitude soon changed due to both the market and to regulations. Over time, the settlers began to separate the tobacco into sections of equal quality. The leaves were then tied together in Hands, bunches of five to fourteen. The Hands were returned to platforms to sweat. When they were once again "in case", the inspection of the crop could take place and the final processing for export begin.

Early on, the preparation of tobacco for shipping was very simple. The tobacco leaves were twisted and rolled, then spun into rope, which was wound into balls weighing as much as a hundred pounds ( 45 kilograms ). These balls were protected in canvas or barrels, which would then be shipped to Europe. Although the export of bulk tobacco was not outlawed until 1730, a large barrel called a "hogshead" soon became the favored container throughout the colonial period. Even though its capacity varied slightly, governed by the regulations of the day, the average weight of the tobacco stored in a hogshead barrel was about a thousand pounds ( 450 kilograms ).

These barrels were transported in a variety of ways to the ships on which they would be carried to England. At first, captains of merchant vessels simply traveled from one plantation dock to the next, loading up with barrels of tobacco as they moved along the river. Other ways included employing northern smugglers to ferry tobacco to England.

Plantations in the American South

In 1609, English colonist John Rolfe arrived at Jamestown, Virginia, and became the first settler to successfully raise tobacco (commonly referred to at that time as "brown gold") for commercial use.  Tobacco was used as currency by the Virginia settlers for years, and Rolfe was able to make his fortune in farming it for export at Varina Farms Plantation.

When he left for England with his wife Pocahontas, a daughter of Chief Powhatan, he had become wealthy. Returning to Jamestown, following Pocahontas' death in England, Rolfe continued in his efforts to improve the quality of commercial tobacco, and, by 1620,  of tobacco were shipped to England.  By the time John Rolfe died in 1622, Jamestown was thriving as a producer of tobacco, and its population had topped 4,000. Tobacco led to the importation of the colony's first Black slaves in 1619.

Throughout the 17th and 18th centuries, tobacco continued to be the cash crop of the Virginia Colony, as well as The Carolinas. Large tobacco warehouses filled the areas near the wharves of new, thriving towns such as Dumfries on the Potomac, Richmond and Manchester at the Fall Line (head of navigation) on the James, and Petersburg on the Appomattox.

There were also tobacco plantations in Tennessee, like Wessyngton in Cedar Hill, Tennessee.

Modern history
A historian of the American South in the late 1860s reported on typical usage in the region where it was grown:

Until 1883, tobacco excise tax accounted for one third of internal revenue collected by the United States government.  Internal Revenue Service data for 1879-80 show total tobacco tax receipts of $38.9 million, out of total receipts of $116.8 million. Following the American Civil War, the tobacco industry struggled as it attempted to adapt. Not only did the labor force change from slavery to sharecropping, but a change in demand also occurred. As in Europe, there was a desire for not only snuff, pipes and cigars, but cigarettes as well.

With a change in demand and a change in labor force, James Bonsack, an avid craftsman, in 1881 created a machine that revolutionized cigarette production.  The machine chopped the tobacco, then dropped a certain amount of the tobacco into a long tube of paper, which the machine would then roll and push out the end where it would be sliced by the machine into individual cigarettes.  This machine operated at thirteen times the speed of a human cigarette roller.

This caused an enormous growth in the tobacco industry that lasted well into the 20th century, until the scientific revelations discovering health consequences of smoking and tobacco companies' usage of chemical additives was revealed.

In the United States, The Family Smoking Prevention and Tobacco Control Act (Tobacco Control Act) became law in 2009. It gave the Food and Drug Administration (FDA) the authority to regulate the manufacture, distribution, and marketing of tobacco products to protect public health.

Health concerns

Nazi Germany saw the first modern anti-smoking campaign, the National Socialist government condemning tobacco use, funding research against it, levying increasing sin taxes on it, and in 1941 banning tobacco in various public places as a health hazard.

In the UK and the USA, an increase in lung cancer rates was being picked up by the 1930s, but the cause for this increase remained debated and unclear.

A true breakthrough came in 1948, when the British physiologist Richard Doll published the first major studies that proved that smoking could cause serious health damage. In 1950, he published research in the British Medical Journal that showed a close link between smoking and lung cancer. Four years later, in 1954 the British Doctors Study, a study of some 40 thousand doctors over 20 years, confirmed the suggestion, based on which the government issued advice that smoking and lung cancer rates were related. The British Doctors Study lasted till 2001, with result published every ten years and final results published in 2004 by Doll and Richard Peto. Much early research was also done by Dr. Ochsner. Reader's Digest magazine for many years published frequent anti-smoking articles.

In 1964 the United States Surgeon General's Report on Smoking and Health likewise began suggesting the relationship between smoking and cancer, which confirmed its suggestions 20 years later in the 1980s.

Partial controls and regulatory measures eventually followed in much of the developed world, including partial advertising bans, minimum age of sale requirements, and basic health warnings on tobacco packaging. However, smoking prevalence and associated ill health continued to rise in the developed world in the first three decades following Richard Doll's discovery, with governments sometimes reluctant to curtail a habit seen as popular as a result - and increasingly organised disinformation efforts by the tobacco industry and their proxies (covered in more detail below). Realisation dawned gradually that the health effects of smoking and tobacco use were susceptible only to a multi-pronged policy response which combined positive health messages with medical assistance to cease tobacco use and effective marketing restrictions, as initially indicated in a 1962 overview by the British Royal College of Physicians and the 1964 report of the U.S. Surgeon General.

In the 1950s tobacco companies engaged in a cigarette advertising war surrounding the tar content in cigarettes that came to be known as the tar derby. The companies repositioned their brands to emphasize low tar content, filter technology and nicotine levels.  The period ended in 1959 after the Federal Trade Commission (FTC) Chairman and several cigarette company presidents agreed to discontinue usage of tar or nicotine levels in advertisements.

In order to reduce the potential burden of disease, the World Health Organization (WHO) successfully rallied 168 countries to sign the Framework Convention on Tobacco Control in 2003. The Convention is designed to push for effective legislation and its enforcement in all countries to reduce the harmful effects of tobacco.

In science 
The tobacco smoke enema was the principal medical method to resuscitate victims of drowning in the 18th century.

As a lucrative crop, tobacco has been the subject of a great deal of biological and genetic research. The economic impact of Tobacco Mosaic disease was the impetus that led to the isolation of Tobacco mosaic virus, the first virus to be identified; the fortunate coincidence that it is one of the simplest viruses and can self-assemble from purified nucleic acid and protein led, in turn, to the rapid advancement of the field of virology. The 1946 Nobel Prize in Chemistry was shared by Wendell Meredith Stanley for his 1935 work crystallizing the virus and showing that it remains active.

References

Bibliography 

 Benedict, Carol (2011). Golden-Silk Smoke: A History of Tobacco in China, 1550-2010.
 Brandt, Allan (2007). The Cigarette Century: The Rise, Fall, and Deadly Persistence of the Product That Defined America.
 Breen, T. H. (1985). Tobacco Culture. Princeton, NJ: Princeton University Press. . Source on tobacco culture in 18th-century Virginia pp. 46–55
 Burns, Eric (2007). The Smoke of the Gods: A Social History of Tobacco. Philadelphia: Temple University Press.
 Collins, W.K., and S.N. Hawks (1993). Principles of Flue-Cured Tobacco Production.
 Cosner, Charlotte (2015). The Golden Leaf: How Tobacco Shaped Cuba and the Atlantic World. Vanderbilt University Press. 
 Fuller, R. Reese (Spring 2003). Perique, the Native Crop. Louisiana Life.
 Gately, Iain (2003). Tobacco: A Cultural History of How an Exotic Plant Seduced Civilization. Grove Press. .
 Goodman, Jordan (1993).  Tobacco in History: The Cultures of Dependence.
 Graves, John. "Tobacco That Is not Smoked" in From a Limestone Ledge (the sections on snuff and chewing tobacco) 
 Grehan, James (2006). Smoking and "Early Modern" Sociability: The Great Tobacco Debate in the Ottoman Middle East (Seventeenth to Eighteenth Centuries). The American Historical Review 3#5 online
 Hahn, Barbara (2011). Making Tobacco Bright: Creating an American Commodity, 1617-1937. Johns Hopkins University Press. 248 pages; examines how marketing, technology, and demand figured in the rise of Bright Flue-Cured Tobacco, a variety first grown in the inland Piedmont region of the Virginia-North Carolina border.
 Killebrew, J. B. and Myrick, Herbert (1909). Tobacco Leaf: Its Culture and Cure, Marketing and Manufacture. Orange Judd Company. Source for flea beetle typology (p. 243)
 Kluger, Richard (1996). Ashes to Ashes: America's Hundred-Year Cigarette War.
 Murphey, Rhoads (2007). Studies on Ottoman Society and Culture: 16th-18th Centuries. Burlington, VT: Ashgate: Variorum.  
 Poche, L. Aristee (2002). Perique Tobacco: Mystery and history.
 Price, Jacob M. (1954). "The rise of Glasgow in the Chesapeake tobacco trade, 1707-1775." William and Mary Quarterly  pp: 179-199. in JSTOR
 Tilley, Nannie May The Bright Tobacco Industry 1860–1929 . 
 Schoolcraft, Henry R. (1851–57). Historical and Statistical Information respecting the Indian Tribes of the United States. Philadelphia.
 Shechter, Relli (2006). Smoking, Culture and Economy in the Middle East: The Egyptian Tobacco Market 1850–2000. New York: I.B. Tauris & Co. Ltd.

External links 

History of tobacco article from Big Site of Amazing Facts
Boston University MedicalCenter 
History of Tobacco from License To Vape 
Tobacco in World War II
information on tobacco and cigarettes
Modern History of Smoking